The Diocese of Cefalù is a Roman Catholic ecclesiastical territory in Sicily, southern Italy. It is a suffragan of the Archdiocese of Palermo.

History

The first known bishop of Cefalù was Nicetas who, in 869, assisted at the Eighth General Council held at Constantinople for the trial of Photius. Marzo Ferro believes that the diocese was founded in the fifth century.  Following Nicetas, the Arab occupation of Sicily made the regular election of bishops impossible. When Roger I of Sicily, rebuilt the city, Iocelmo was bishop. A confirmation of the privileges of the Church of Cefalù, granted by King Martin and Queen Maria on 10 June 1392, names King Roger as the ecclesiae ejusdem fundator (founder of that Church).

The Cathedral of the Holy Saviour was planned and begun under orders of King Roger in 1131. The mosaics were commissioned by King Roger in 1148. The basilica was consecrated on 10 April 1267, by Cardinal Rodolfo, Bishop of Albano, the Papal Legate. From its beginning the cathedral was served by a chapter which followed the rule of S. Augustine (O.S.A.). In 1671, however, under Bishop Giovanni Roano e Carrionero, the Chapter was converted by Pope Clement X into a corporation of secular priests. In accordance with Pope Clement's bull, the Chapter was composed of four dignities (Dean, Archdeacon, Cantor and Theologian) and eight Canons.

In the century between 1276 and 1376, for which there happens to be documentary evidence, the city of Cefalù saw its population drop from c. 11,000 to c. 2000. The Black Death no doubt played a major role in that catastrophe, though the Sicilian Vespers (which began in 1282) played a part.

On 5 March 1823 a major earthquake and a significant aftershock struck the entire northern coast of the island of Sicily. At Cefalù there was a tsunami that washed boats out to sea. The Gazzetta di Genoa reported that the upper part of the campanile of the convent of S. Francesco had fallen, and the convent of S. Pasquale had been destroyed, but that there had been no loss of life.

A well-known native son of the diocese of Cefalù was Cardinal Mariano Rampolla del Tindaro, who was born in the village of Polizzi.  Rampolla was Pope Leo XIII's Secretary of State, and was the leading candidate to succeed him in the Conclave of 1903.  Rampolla was vetoed, however, by the government of Franz Joseph I of Austria.

Bishops of Cefalù
Latin rite: Erected: 1131

to 1400
Iocelmo (c. 1140 – 1150)
Harduinus (Arduino) (c.1150 – 1156)
Boso (1157–1173)
? Joannes (or Guido) de Bavera
Guido de Anania (1173–1193)
Benedictus, O.S.A.
Ioannes Cicala (1194 – after September 1215)
Aldoinus (Arduino) (attested 18 May 1217 – 1248)
Riccardus de Logotheta, O.Min. (attested 1249 – 10 June 1253)
Thomas Fusconis de Berta, O.P. (30 September 1253 – 13 December 1253)
Ioannes Stephani (9 February 1254 – after 15 March 1271)
Petrus de Taurino (attested 28 December 1271 – 12 August 1274)
Ioannes Francigena (attested 3 April 1275 – 8 June 1280)
Iuncta de Magistro Benintendi de Panormo (attested 15 January 1281 – 1290)
Jacobus de Nernia (10 January 1304 – )
Rogerius de S. Joanne (22 January 1324 – )
Robertus Campuli, O.Min. (14 October 1333 – )
Galganus Blasii, O.Min. (20 November 1342 – )
Nicolaus de Burellis (14 October 1353 – )
Guilelmus de Salamone, O.Min. (18 March 1388 – 1397)
 Sede Vacante

from 1400 to 1600

Julianus, O.P. (31 March 1406 – )
Antonius de Florentia, O.Min. (11 March 1412 – )
Philippus (27 August 1414 – )
Antonio Ponticorona, O.P. (20 November 1422 – 23 Jul 1445)
Luca de Sarzana, O.F.M. (23 Jul 1445 – 1471 Died)
Giovanni Gatto (1 Jun 1472 – 18 Aug 1475)
Bernardo Margarit, O.S.B. (18 Aug 1475 – 8 Feb 1479)
Giovanni Gatto (8 Feb 1479 – 1484)
Francesco de Noya, O.F.M. (26 Nov 1484 – 18 Apr 1492 Died)
Paolo Della Cavalleria (30 Mar 1495 – 1496 Died)
Rinaldo Montoro e Landolina, O.P. (12 Oct 1496 – 1511 Died)
Juan Requeséns (18 Jan 1512 – 1517 Resigned)
 Juan Sánchez (bishop) (4 Nov 1517 – 1518 Died)
 Cardinal Guillén-Ramón de Vich y de Vallterra (22 Oct 1518 – 7 Jun 1525)
Francisco de Aragón (7 Jun 1525 – 22 Jun 1561 Died)
Antonino Faraone (17 Apr 1562 – 9 Feb 1569)
Rodrigo de Vadillo, O.S.B. (9 Feb 1569 – 1 Feb 1578 Died)
Ottaviano Preconio (11 Aug 1578 – 11 Apr 1587 Died)
Francesco Gonzaga, O.F.M. Obs. (26 Oct 1587 – 29 Jan 1593)
Nicolò Stizzia (23 May 1594 – 17 Feb 1596 Died)
Manuel Quero Turillo (18 Dec 1596 – 2 Sep 1605 Died)

from 1600 to 1800

Martino Mira (29 Jan 1607 – 1619 Died)
Manuel Esteban Muniera, O. de M. (29 Mar 1621 – 14 Oct 1631 Died)
Ottavio Branciforte (10 Jan 1633 – 2 Mar 1638)
Pietro Corsetto (21 Jun 1638 – 23 Oct 1643 Died)
Marco Antonio Gussio (23 May 1644 – 22 Aug 1650)
Francesco Gisulfo e Osorio (21 Nov 1650 – 30 Sep 1658)
Giovanni Roano e Corrionero (16 Feb 1660 – 27 Nov 1673)
Matteo Orlandi, O. Carm. (25 Jun 1674 – 13 Nov 1695 Died)
José Sanz de Villaragut, O.F.M. (18 Jun 1696 – 29 Aug 1698 Died)
Joseph Antoine Muscella, O.F.M. (25 Sep 1702 – 22 Jun 1716 Died)
Domenico di Val Guarnera, C.Orat. (17 Nov 1732 – 2 May 1751 Died)
Agatino Maria Reggio Statella (17 Jul 1752 – 16 Jan 1755 Resigned)
Gioacchino Castello (21 Jul 1755 – 12 Jul 1788 Died)
Francesco Vanni, C.R. (30 Mar 1789 – 29 Nov 1803 Died)

since 1800

Domenico Spoto (28 May 1804 – 29 Dec 1808 Died)
Giovanni Sergio (19 Dec 1814 – 27 Feb 1827 Died)
Pietro Tasca (17 Sep 1827 – 2 Jan 1839 Died)
Giovanni Maria Visconte Proto, O.S.B. (17 Jun 1844 – 13 Oct 1854 Died)
Ruggero Blundo, O.S.B. (15 Mar 1858 – 18 Mar 1888 Died)
Gaetano d’Alessandro (18 Mar 1888 – 8 May 1906 Resigned)
Anselmo Evangelista Sansoni, O.F.M. (30 Oct 1907 – 18 Jun 1921 Died)
Giovanni Pulvirenti (19 Aug 1922 – 11 Sep 1933 Died)
Emiliano Cagnoni (5 May 1934 – 28 Sep 1969 Died)
Calogero Lauricella (4 Jun 1970 – 8 Sep 1973 Appointed, Archbishop of Siracusa)
Salvatore Cassisa (1 Dec 1973 – 11 Mar 1978 Appointed, Archbishop of Monreale)
Emanuele Catarinicchia (11 Nov 1978 – 7 Dec 1987 Appointed, Bishop of Mazara del Vallo)
Rosario Mazzola (23 Jul 1988 – 18 Mar 2000 Retired)
Francesco Sgalambro (18 Mar 2000 – 17 Sep 2009 Retired)
Vincenzo Manzella (17 Sep 2009 – )

References

Books

Reference Works
 (in Latin)
 (in Latin)

 pp. 946–947. (Use with caution; obsolete)
 (in Latin)
 (in Latin)
 (in Latin)

Studies

Kamp, Norbert (1975). Kirche und Monarchie im staufischen Königreich Sizilien: I. Prosopographische Grundlegung, Bistumer und Bischofe des Konigreichs 1194–1266: 3. Sizilien München: Wilhelm Fink 1975.

acknowledgment

Roman Catholic dioceses in Sicily
Roman Catholic dioceses established in the 12th century